Jalometalli is the Finnish word for noble metal. It may also refer to:

Jalometalli Metal Music Festival, a metal festival held annually in August in Oulu, Finland.